The women's light welterweight 64 kg boxing event at the 2015 European Games in Baku was held from 20 to 26 June at the Baku Crystal Hall.

Results

References

External links

Women 64
2015 in women's boxing